Tiruttani taluk is a taluk of Tiruvallur district of the Indian state of Tamil Nadu. The headquarters of the taluk is the town of Tiruttani. Some parts of the taluk including Tiruttani town comes under the jurisdiction of the Greater Chennai Metropolitan Area.

Demographics
According to the 2011 census, the taluk of Tiruttani had a population of 210,424 with 105,239  males and 105,185 females. There were 999 women for every 1000 men. The taluk had a literacy rate of 66.11. Child population in the age group below 6 was 11,207 Males and 10,273 Females.

References 

Taluks of Tiruvallur district